Curt Wiberg (15 October 1898 – 22 November 1988) was a Swedish sprinter. He competed in the men's 100 metres and the 4x100 metres relay events at the 1924 Summer Olympics.

References

External links
 

1898 births
1988 deaths
Athletes (track and field) at the 1924 Summer Olympics
Swedish male sprinters
Olympic athletes of Sweden
Sportspeople from Malmö
20th-century Swedish people